The 35th Signal Battalion is a reserve unit of the United States Army. The 35th provides critical battlefield communications in support of combat operations worldwide. It is headquartered in Fort Allen, Puerto Rico. The 35th Signal Battalion is made up of the following companies: HHC, A Co, B Co, C Co. It currently has soldiers deployed in the Global War on Terror in support of operations in Iraq (Operation Iraqi Freedom) and Afghanistan (Operation Enduring Freedom).

Lineage
Constituted 11 May 1942 in the Army of the United States as the 35th Signal Construction Battalion
Activated 23 February 1943 at Camp Crowder, Missouri
Reorganized and redesignated 20 May 1945 as the 35th Signal Light Construction Battalion
Inactivated 5 October 1945 at Camp Polk, Louisiana
Allotted 12 January 1948 to the Organized Reserves
Activated 16 January 1948 with headquarters at Newark, New Jersey
(Organized Reserves redesignated 25 March 1948 as the Organized Reserve Corps; redesignated 9 July 1952 as the Army Reserve)

Reorganized and redesignated 1 November 1950 as the 35th Signal Aviation Construction Battalion
Reorganized and redesignated 25 April 1952 as the 35th Signal Construction Battalion
Reorganized and redesignated 15 July 1953 as the 35th Signal Battalion
Location of headquarters changed 7 February 1958 to Jersey City, New Jersey
Inactivated 24 July 1959 at Jersey City, New Jersey
Activated 16 November 1980 at Fort Allen, Puerto Rico
807th Signal Company Activated 1 November 2004 in support of Operation Iraqi Freedom and Operation Enduring freedom Fort Allen, Puerto Rico
35th SIG BN deployed as the 35th Integrated Theater Signal Battalion in support of OPERATION IRAQI FREEDOM on 8 July 2007. Fort Allen, Puerto Rico
Reorganized 30 January 2011 as the 35th Expeditionary Signal Battalion (ESB)
B Company, 35th Expeditionary Signal Battalion deployed to Iraq in support of OPERATION IRAQI FREEDOM on 23 September 2009. Aguadilla, Puerto Rico
35th Expeditionary Signal Battalion deployed to Kuwait in support of in support of OPERATION ENDURING FREEDOM on 27 November 2014.

Honors

Campaign streamers

World War II
	Normandy (with arrowhead)
	Northern France
	Rhineland
	Ardennes-Alsace
	Central Europe

Decorations
Meritorious Unit Commendation, streamer embroidered EUROPEAN THEATER (35th Sig Const Bn cited for period 7 Jun – 6 Aug 1944; GO 44 Hq, 1st Army, 16 Mar 1945)

Subordinate units
Headquarters and Headquarters Company (HHC), 35th Signal Battalion | Fort Allen, Puerto Rico
A Company | Yauco, Puerto Rico
B Company | Aguadilla, Puerto Rico
C Company | San Juan, Puerto Rico
S1 – Personnel
S2/S3 – Operations, Plans, Training, Intelligence & Security
S4 – Logistics
Chaplain - Religious Services
807th Signal Company - deactivated in 2007

Coat of arms
Shield Tenne, five flashes radiating from base point argent, on a chief of the last three telephone poles palewise connected by two wires throughout of the first.

Crest That for the regiments and separate battalions of the Army Reserve: On a wreath of the colors (argent and tenne) the Lexington Minute Man proper. The statue of the Minute Man, Captain John Parker (H.H. Kitson, sculptor) stands on the Common in Lexington, Massachusetts.

Motto We Carry the word.

Orange and white are the colors of the Signal Corps. The telephone poles are symbolic of the construction activities of the organization. The five flashes commemorate the campaigns of World War II. Additionally, the flashes are indicative of messages carried over the wires. The three poles and five flashes are suggestive of the numerical designation of the organization.

References

035
Military units and formations in Puerto Rico